The Hoover Chair (French: Chaire Hoover d'éthique économique et sociale), was established at the University of Louvain (UCLouvain) in Louvain-la-Neuve, Belgium, by Pierre Macq in 1991. This was made possible by a generous donation from the Hoover Foundation for university development. Notable lecturers include Prof. Philippe Van Parijs, Axel Gosseries, Jean-Michel Chaumont, Hervé Pourtois and Christian Arnsperger.

Goal
 Stimulate research and teaching that make room for an explicit and rigorous discussion of ethical issues.
 Organize activities which contribute to a clear and well informed public debate about ethical issues.

External links
 Hoover Chair

References

Catholic universities and colleges in Belgium
Pontifical universities
Foundations based in Belgium
1991 establishments in Belgium
Université catholique de Louvain